"Posh!" is an up tempo song and musical number from the popular 1968 Albert R. Broccoli motion picture, Chitty Chitty Bang Bang.  It is written by the songwriting team of Sherman & Sherman. It makes reference to the myth that the word "posh" is an acronym for "Port Out, Starboard Home".  In the film it is sung when "Grandpa Potts" (played by Lionel Jeffries) is being carried away in his outhouse.  He sees the situation as serendipitous until he finally meets his kidnapper, Baron Bomburst in Vulgaria.

Use in stage musical
The song is also featured prominently in the 2002 and 2005 stage musical versions of the film.  In the stage musical versions, Grandpa sings the song to the children in the family dining room and not while being kidnapped. An extra verse was also added to the beginning of the stage version, to tell the story of when Grandpa sailed out from Liverpool. The song is reprised a few times and is used as "Grandpa's" leitmotif.

References

 Sherman, Robert B. Walt's Time: from before to beyond, Santa Clarita: Camphor Tree Publishers, 1998.

1968 songs
Songs from Chitty Chitty Bang Bang
Songs written by the Sherman Brothers